Lakhani is a North Indian surname, which means "descendant of Lakh", derived from the Sanskrit laksmana, meaning "one who has auspicious marks". The name originates from Gujarat, India. The surname may refer to: 

Ali Lakhani (born 1955), British writer
Hemant Lakhani (1935–2013), British businessman
Iqbal Ali Lakhani, Pakistani industrialist
Isha Lakhani (born 1985), Indian tennis player
Karim R. Lakhani (born 1970), American business theorist
Mayur Lakhani (born 1960), British doctor
Sultan Ali Lakhani (born 1948), Pakistani businessman
Vishen Lakhani (born 1976), Malaysian-born entrepreneur, author and motivational speaker, of Indian descent.

References

Indian surnames
Pakistani names